Cristian César Gómez (4 November 1987 – 24 May 2015) was an Argentine professional footballer who played as a defender for 9 de Julio de Rafaela, Deportivo Armenio, Sportivo Patria and Atlético Paraná. He died during a game in May 2015.

References

1987 births
2015 deaths
Argentine footballers
9 de Julio de Rafaela players
Deportivo Armenio footballers
Sportivo Patria footballers
Club Atlético Paraná players
Association football defenders
Association football players who died while playing
Sport deaths in Argentina